The African wall gecko (Tarentola hoggarensis) is found in northern Africa.

References

Tarentola
Reptiles described in 1937
Taxa named by Franz Werner